The Texan Corps of Cadets is a student military organization at Tarleton State University located on the university's main campus in Stephenville, Texas. Tarleton's original Corps of Cadets traces its roots to 1917 but was reactivated in 2016 after becoming inactive in the 1950's. Tarleton is a member of the Association of Military Colleges & Schools of the United States.

Cadet life

Military service 
Members of the Texan Corps of Cadets are not required to serve in the military upon completion of the program or their degree. Since 1917 Tarleton has participated in the Senior Reserve Officers’ Training Corps (ROTC)  which does require a commitment for military service upon graduation. While separate programs, they are both administered by the College of Liberal & Fine Arts within the School of Criminology, Criminal Justice and Strategic Studies.

Cadets may pursue programs for US Army, US Air Force, and US Marine Corps.

Academics 
The Texan Corps of Cadets offers students an opportunity to obtain a minor in Leadership Studies. All cadets live together in a residence hall at Tarleton called Traditions South. All Cadets wear their uniforms to class every day and must abide by the regulations set forth in the "Chisel".

Special units

Commandant of Cadets 

 Colonel Kenny Weldon (1 July 2015 - 1 July 2022)
 Colonel Douglas Simon (since 1 July 2022)

References 

Student organizations established in 1917
Military academies of the United States
Military education and training in the United States
Educational institutions established in 1917
Education in Texas
1917 establishments in Texas